Manharan Lal Pandey (27 October 1938 - 21 January 2013) was an Indian Politician and Member of Parliament representing Janjgir constituency of Madhya Pradesh (now in Chhattisgarh) in 11th Lok Sabha. He was a member of the Bharatiya Janata Party.

Career
Pandey was first elected to Madhya Pradesh Legislative Assembly in 1967 from Takhatpur on Jan Sangh ticket and became Minister of State for Electricity. In 1972 Election, he lost the seat to Congress Party but won 1977 election on Janata Party ticket and became Minister of State in Kailash Chandra Joshi and Virendra Kumar Sakhlecha ministry. Again, he lost 1980 election but won 1985, 1990 and 1993 election consecutively. He was elected to 11th Lok Sabha in 1996 but lost 1998 General election to Charan Das Mahant of Congress by margin of 44,586 votes.

References

India MPs 1996–1997
1938 births
Living people
Bharatiya Janata Party politicians from Chhattisgarh
Lok Sabha members from Chhattisgarh
People from Janjgir-Champa district
People from Bilaspur district, Chhattisgarh
Madhya Pradesh MLAs 1967–1972
Madhya Pradesh MLAs 1977–1980
Madhya Pradesh MLAs 1985–1990
Madhya Pradesh MLAs 1990–1992
Madhya Pradesh MLAs 1993–1998